W is a 2014 Indian Hindi-language musical thriller film directed by Tarun Madan Chopra, based on a script written by Daboo Sardar Malik and Tarun Madan Chopra. The movie starred Leeza Mangaldas, Leslie Tripathy, Sonal Giani, Raaj Singh Arora, Abhey Jit Attri and Danish Pandor and released on 14 March 2014. It underperformed at the box office.

Synopsis
Sandy (Leeza Mangaldas), Ruhi (Leslie Tripathy), and Manu (Sonal Giani) are three best friends that run W, an event management company that focuses on music events. While traveling to The Freedom Concert, an event that was supposed to be their big break, they come across a group of misogynistic men who don't like how modern and self-sufficient the three women are and end up raping them. Because the three men are of good social standing, the police are particularly unhelpful and the women are traumatized by how they are treated afterwards. This prompts the three women to form the Vengeance Squad in order to take their own revenge against their rapists.

Cast
 Leeza Mangaldas as Sandhya Singh a.k.a. Sandy
 Leslie Tripathy as Roohi Malik
 Sonal Giani as Manu
 Raaj Singh Arora as Abhay a.k.a. Bhaiji
 Danish Pandor as Dhruv
 Abhey Jit Attri as Chote
 Meer Ali
 Gagan Guru

Production and release

In January 2013 it was confirmed that Leslie Tripathy would be performing in the film in an unspecified role, as would Leeza Mangaldas, Sonal Gyaani, Raj Arora, Daanish Pandor and Abhey Attri. Filming took place in Delhi.

Reception
The Times of India panned the film, giving it 1 1/2 stars and stating "There is no emotional conflict in the story that provokes you to think or get inspired. Situations are written to convenience the protagonists' quest for revenge. And they get it way too easy. The shallow treatment doesn't live up to the topic addressed."Business Insider criticized the film as missing the "emotional pain and conflict" that similarly themed films such as Adalat o Ekti Meye possessed, commenting that they felt W was a "stereotype revenge drama that [worked] out all too smoothly".

Music
The film's music and background score is written and composed by Daboo Malik. The musical duo of Amaal Mallik and Armaan Malik will be contributing to the soundtrack as singers, as will Neha Bhasin, and Apeksha Dandekar.

Track list

References

External links 
 
 
 "Legacy Film Productions LLP"

2010s Hindi-language films
2014 films
Indian thriller films
Indian musical films
2010s musical films
2014 thriller films
Hindi-language thriller films